Dame Kelly Holmes  (born 19 April 1970) is a retired British middle distance athlete.

Holmes specialised in the 800 metres and 1,500 metres events and won gold medals for both distances at the 2004 Summer Olympics in Athens. She set British records in numerous events and still holds the records over the 600, and 1,000 metre distances. She held the British 800 metre record until 2021.

Inspired by a number of successful British middle-distance runners in the early 1980s, Holmes began competing in middle-distance events in her youth.  She joined the British Army, but continued to compete at the organisation's athletics events.  She turned to the professional athletics circuit in 1993 and in 1994 she won the 1,500 m at the Commonwealth Games and took silver at the European Championships.  She won a silver and a bronze medal at the 1995 Gothenburg World Championships, but suffered from various injuries over the following years, failing to gain a medal at her first Olympics in Atlanta 1996 when running with a stress fracture. She won silver in the 1,500 m at the 1998 Commonwealth Games and bronze in the 800 m at the 2000 Sydney Olympics, her first Olympic medal.

Holmes won the 1,500 m at the 2002 Commonwealth Games and the 800 m bronze at the Munich European Championships that year.  The 2003 track season saw her take silver in the 1,500 m at the World Indoor Championships and the 800 m silver medals at the World Championships and first World Athletics Final.

She took part in her final major championship in 2004, with a double gold medal-winning performance at the Athens Olympics, finishing as the 800 m and 1,500 m Olympic Champion. For her achievements she won numerous awards and was appointed Dame Commander of the Order of the British Empire (DBE) in 2005. She retired from athletics in 2005 and has since been made an honorary colonel with the Royal Armoured Corps Training Regiment (RACTR). She has become a global motivational speaker, published five books, her latest being Running Life, and made a number of television appearances.

Early life and army career

Holmes was born in Pembury, near Tunbridge Wells in Kent, the daughter of Derrick Holmes, a Jamaican-born car mechanic, and an English mother, Pam Norman. Her mother was 17 at the time of her birth, and seven years later married painter and decorator Michael Norris, whom Holmes regards as her father. Holmes grew up in Hildenborough, Kent, where she attended Hildenborough CEP School, and then Hugh Christie Comprehensive School in Tonbridge from the age of 12.

She started training for athletics at the age of 12, joining Tonbridge Athletics Club, where she was coached by David Arnold and went on to win the English Schools 1,500 metres in her second season in 1983. Her hero was British middle-distance runner Steve Ovett, and she was inspired by his success at the 1980 Summer Olympics.

However, Holmes later turned away from athletics, joining the British Army at the age of 18, having left school two years earlier to work first as an assistant in a sweet shop and later as a nursing assistant for disabled patients. In the army, she became a HGV driver in the Women's Royal Army Corps (WRAC), later becoming a basic physical training instructor (PTI). Holmes then elected in June 1990 to attend the first course to be run under the army's new physical training syllabus, and passed out as a Class 2 PTI. Although militarily quite young, Holmes's athletic prowess was impressive and she was encouraged to attend the course selection for full-time transfer to the Royal Army Physical Training Corps (RAPTC) at Aldershot.

Holmes eventually qualified as a class 1 PTI, although she remained in the Adjutant General's Corps after the disbandment of the WRAC in 1992. She also became British Army judo champion and at an athletics event, she competed in and won an 800 metres, a 3,000 metres and a relay race in a single day. She also won the heptathlon.

Holmes watched the 1992 Summer Olympics on television, and on seeing Lisa York in the heats of the 3,000 metres – an athlete whom she had competed against, and beaten – she decided to return to athletics. For several years she combined athletics with employment in the army, until increased funding allowed her to become a full-time athlete in 1997.

Career

2004 Athens Olympic Games

While training in 2003 for the 2004 Summer Olympics at a French training camp, Holmes suffered leg injuries and was depressed, she began cutting herself. "I made one cut for every day that I had been injured", Holmes stated in an interview with the News of the World newspaper. At least once, she considered suicide, but she eventually sought help from a doctor and was diagnosed with clinical depression. While she could not use anti-depressants because it would affect her performance, she began using herbal serotonin tablets. In 2005, after her achievements at the 2004 Summer Olympics, Holmes chose to talk about her self-harm to show others that being a professional athlete is an extremely difficult thing to do and places the athlete under tremendous amounts of stress. Later, in September 2017, Holmes explained that "at my lowest, I was cutting myself with scissors every day that I was injured." Holmes's honesty quickly won her praise from people on Twitter.

2004 saw Holmes arrive at a major competition, the Athens Olympics, with no injury worries for just about the first time in her career. She had originally planned to compete in just the 1,500 m but a victory over Jolanda Čeplak before the games had many saying she should take her chance in the 800 m as well. Holmes did not announce her decision to race in both events until five days before the 800 m finals.

Along with three time World Champion Maria de Lurdes Mutola and Čeplak, Holmes was considered one of the favourites for the gold medal in the 800 m. In the final, Holmes ran a well-paced race, ignoring a fast start by a number of the other competitors, and moved into the lead ahead of Mutola on the final bend, taking the gold on the line ahead of Hasna Benhassi and Čeplak, with Mutola in fourth. Holmes became the seventh British woman to win an athletics gold, and the second after Ann Packer in 1964 to win the 800 metres.

In the final of the 1,500 m, again running from the rear of the field, she took the lead in the final straight, holding off World Champion Tatyana Tomashova of Russia. She thus became only the third woman in history to do the 800 m and 1,500 m double (after Tatyana Kazankina of the Soviet Union in 1976 and Svetlana Masterkova of Russia in 1996), and Britain's first double gold medallist at the same games since Albert Hill in 1920. Her time of 3 minutes 57.90 seconds in the 1,500m final set a new British record for the distance.

Subsequently, Holmes was given the honour of carrying the British flag at the closing ceremony of the games, on 29 August, the day after her second victory. A homecoming parade was held in her honour through the streets of Hildenborough and Tonbridge on 1 September, which was attended by approximately 40,000 people. Holmes won the BBC Sports Personality of the Year in 2004, saying she achieved her goals after "20 years of dreaming". She also asserted the award was "the biggest sporting honour your country can give you". The tributes to her at the BBC awards ceremony were led by the six British female athletes who had previously won gold at the Olympic Games in a "Magnificent Seven"-style feature – those six being Mary Rand, Ann Packer, Mary Peters, Tessa Sanderson, Sally Gunnell and Denise Lewis.

Personal bests

 All information taken from IAAF profile and UK All time lists.

Competition record

 Note: In addition to these achievements, Holmes has also won 12 national titles.

Honours and awards

In 2010, Holmes was inducted into the England Athletics Hall of Fame.

In 2018, she was made honorary colonel of the Royal Armoured Corps Training Regiment.

Dame Kelly Holmes Trust

In 2008, Holmes founded the Dame Kelly Holmes Trust, a registered charity, to support young athletes and help the lives of young people facing disadvantage across the UK. As part of her pledge to the charity, she participated in the Powerman UK duathlon in 2014, one of several fundraising events she took part in.

Post-athletics career

Since 2004, Holmes has taken part in "On Camp with Kelly" athletics camps which train junior athletes, sponsored by insurance company Aviva (formerly Norwich Union).

In 2005, she won the Laureus World Sports Award for Sportswoman of the Year. The same year, she named the P&O Cruise ship MS Arcadia. On 21 August, she competed in her final race in the UK, the 800 m at the Norwich Union British Grand Prix meeting in Sheffield. Her training schedule during the summer of 2005 had been disrupted by a recurrent Achilles tendon injury, and she finished the race in eighth place, limping across the finish line and completing a lap of honour on a buggy.

On 6 December 2005, Holmes announced her retirement from athletics, saying she had reassessed her future after the death of a friend, as well as citing a lack of motivation to continue.

In May 2009, Holmes was named as the president of Commonwealth Games England, succeeding Sir Chris Chataway, who had held the post since 1994. The organisation's chairman Sir Andrew Foster said: "Dame Kelly has been an outstanding athlete both for Team England and Great Britain. She is a truly inspirational and respected figure in the sporting world and will be a wonderful ambassador for Commonwealth Games England."

On 18 March 2019, Holmes, along with Paula Radcliffe and Sharron Davies, announced they would be writing a letter to the International Olympic Committee targeting trans women who compete in women's sports categories.

Television and radio

In November 2010, Holmes took part in the ITV game show The Cube. In October 2011, she appeared live on Dubai One lifestyle show Studio One where she talked about her life and career after athletics.

In 2013 Holmes became the face of MoneyForce, a programme run by the Royal British Legion to deliver money advice to the UK armed forces.

In early 2015, she took part in the ITV series Bear Grylls: Mission Survive and was the runner-up after a 12-day survival mission.

In 2017, Holmes presented episode five of the BBC One television series Women at War: 100 Years of Service.

In December 2017, Holmes spoke about her 2003 mental health issues in an episode of All in the Mind on BBC Radio 4 and in 2018 was one of the judges of the programme's awards.

Cafe 1809 and The 1809 Hub

In 2014 Holmes opened a cafe and community hub in Hildenborough named Cafe 1809 after her 2004 Olympics bib number. She opened a sister branch of the cafe in Gravesend in 2017, but this closed after a few months.

In October 2018 Holmes announced the cafe would close the following month, before re-opening as The 1809 Hub: "a space for events, pop-ups, and community gatherings".

Personal life

In June 2022, Holmes came out as gay in an interview with the Sunday Mirror, adding that she felt "finally free". She said that she had known she was a lesbian since 1988, when she was in the army; she could not come out then as it was illegal at the time to be gay in the military. After winning two Olympic gold medals at Athens in 2004 and becoming a public figure, she feared there may still be consequences from the army if she came out after leaving, and that she may be shunned within athletics as there were no openly gay sportspeople she knew of. LGBT campaigners celebrated Holmes coming out, saying that it sheds light on the historic homophobia that can still serve as a barrier to older people coming out.

Later that month, on 26 June, ITV broadcast a 55-minute documentary Kelly Holmes: Being Me in which she describes her fears of her sexuality being exposed, and meets two people who were discharged from the military for being gay. Holmes wrote: "The documentary taught me so much about generational and social advancements when it comes to the LGBTQ+ world."

Artistic recognition

In 2012, Holmes was one of five Olympians chosen for a series of body-casting artworks by Louise Giblin, exhibited in London with copies being sold in aid of the charity Headfirst.

In 2017 a statue of Holmes by sculptor Guy Portelli was erected in Tonbridge.

Bibliography

References

External links

 
 
 
 
 
 
 Kelly Holmes at The Guardian
 "The real Holmes truth" at BBC Sport

1970 births
Military personnel from Kent
Adjutant General's Corps soldiers
Athletes (track and field) at the 1996 Summer Olympics
Athletes (track and field) at the 2000 Summer Olympics
Athletes (track and field) at the 2004 Summer Olympics
Athletes (track and field) at the 1994 Commonwealth Games
Athletes (track and field) at the 1998 Commonwealth Games
Athletes (track and field) at the 2002 Commonwealth Games
BBC Sports Personality of the Year winners
Black British sportswomen
Commonwealth Games gold medallists for England
Commonwealth Games medallists in athletics
Commonwealth Games silver medallists for England
Dames Commander of the Order of the British Empire
English female middle-distance runners
English Olympic medallists
English people of Jamaican descent
Lesbian sportswomen
English LGBT sportspeople
LGBT track and field athletes
European Athletics Championships medalists
Laureus World Sports Awards winners
Living people
Medalists at the 2000 Summer Olympics
Medalists at the 2004 Summer Olympics
Olympic athletes of Great Britain
Olympic bronze medallists for Great Britain
Olympic bronze medalists in athletics (track and field)
Olympic gold medallists for Great Britain
Olympic gold medalists in athletics (track and field)
People from Hildenborough
People from Pembury
Royal Army Physical Training Corps soldiers
Sporting dames
Women's Royal Army Corps soldiers
Women in the British Army
World Athletics Championships medalists
Goodwill Games medalists in athletics
European Athlete of the Year winners
The Sunday Times Sportswoman of the Year winners
Competitors at the 2001 Goodwill Games
20th-century British Army personnel
Black British military personnel
LGBT Black British people
Medallists at the 1994 Commonwealth Games
Medallists at the 1998 Commonwealth Games
Medallists at the 2002 Commonwealth Games